Dosinia is a genus of saltwater clams, marine bivalve molluscs in the family Veneridae, subfamily Dosiniinae Deshayes, 1853. The shell of Dosinia species is disc-like in shape, usually white, and therefore is reminiscent of the shells of Lucinid bivalves.

The genus is known from the Cretaceous to the Recent periods (age range: 99.7 to 0.0 million years ago). Fossils of species within this genus have been found all over the world.

Species 

Extant and extinct species within this genus include:

 Dosinia abyssicola T. Habe, 1961 Indo
 Dosinia acetabulum  Conrad 1832 †
 Dosinia acetabulum  thori Ward 1992 †
 Dosinia africana  Gray 1838
 Dosinia alta (R. W. Dunker, 1848) Red Sea
 Dosinia altenai Fischer
 Dosinia amphidesmoides (Reeve, 1850) Indo
 Dosinia angulosa Philippi, 1847 Pacific
 Dosinia anus (Philippi, 1848)
 Dosinia aspera Reeve, 1850 Indo
 Dosinia bilunulata (Gray, 1838) Indo
 Dosinia biscocta (Reeve, 1850) Indo
 Dosinia bruguieri (Gray, 1838) Australia
 Dosinia burckhardti  Ihering 1907 †
 Dosinia caelata Reeve, 1851 Red Sea
 Dosinia caerulea  Reeve 1850 †
 Dosinia caerulea Reeve, 1850 Australia
 Dosinia canaliculata G. B. Sowerby III, 1887 China, Japan
 Dosinia castigata  Marwick 1960 †
 Dosinia chikuzenensis  Nagao 1928 †
 Dosinia chipolana  Dall 1903 †
 Dosinia coloradoensis  Rivera 1957 †
 Dosinia concentrica (I. von Born, 1778) - West Indian Dosinia, Pacific
 Dosinia contusa (Reeve, 1850) Australia
 Dosinia corcula Römer, 1870 China
 Dosinia corrugata Reeve, 1850 China, Japan
 Dosinia cumingii Reeve, 1850 China, Japan
 Dosinia derupta Römer, 1860 China
 Dosinia discus (Reeve, 1850) - Disk dosinia, Virginia to Florida  
 Dosinia dunkeri (Philippi, 1844) West America
 Dosinia elegans (Conrad, 1843) - Elegant Dosinia, North Carolina to Texas 
 Dosinia erythraea Römer, 1860  
 Dosinia eudeli Fischer
 Dosinia exasperata (Philippi, 1847) Australia
 Dosinia excisa  Schröter 1788
 Dosinia exoleta (Linnaeus, 1758) - Rayed Artemis, Boreal-Atlantic and Lusitanian regions
 Dosinia extranea (Iredale, 1937) Australia
 Dosinia falconensis  Hodson 1931 †
 Dosinia glauca Reeve, 1850 Japan
 Dosinia greyi Zittel, 1864
 Dosinia gruneri Philippi, 1848 China, Japan
 Dosinia hayashii T. Habe, 1976 Japan
 Dosinia hepatica (Lamarck, 1818) South Africa
 Dosinia histrio  Gmelin 1791
 Dosinia histrio (Gmelin, 1791) Indo
 Dosinia histrio iwakawai Oyama & Habe, 1971 Japan
 Dosinia imparistriata  Tate 1887 †
 Dosinia incisa (Reeve, 1850) Australia
 Dosinia insularum Fischer
 Dosinia isocardia (R. W. Dunker, 1843) West Africa
 Dosinia iwakawai Oyama & Habe, 1971 Indo
 Dosinia japonica (Reeve, 1856) North Pacific [= Reeve, 1850 fide Abbott]
 Dosinia juvenilis (Gmelin, 1791) Indo
 Dosinia kaspiewi  Fischer-Piette 1967 †
 Dosinia kaspiewi Fischer
 Dosinia lambata (Gould, 1850)
 Dosinia lamellatum Reeve, 1850 Japan
 Dosinia laminata (Reeve, 1850) Indo
 Dosinia lechuzaensis  Rivera 1957 †
 Dosinia lucinalis (Lamarck, 1835) Australia
 Dosinia lupinus (Linnaeus, 1758)  - Smooth Artemis, Boreal-Atlantic and Lusitanian regions
 Dosinia lupinus afra Gmelin, 1791 Gabon
 Dosinia lupinus comta S. L. Lovén, 1846 Europe
 Dosinia lupinus lincta Pulteney, 1799 Norway
 Dosinia maoriana Oliver, 1923
 Dosinia mastrichtiensis  Vogel 1895 †
 Dosinia meridonalis  Ihering 1897 †
 Dosinia nanus Reeve, 1850 China
 Dosinia nedigna (Iredale, 1930) Australia
 Dosinia nipponicum  Okutani & Habe, 1988 Japan
 Dosinia orbicularis  Agassiz 1845 †
 Dosinia orbiculata R. W. Dunker, 1877 China, Japan
 Dosinia orbignyi R. W. Dunker, 1845 West Africa
 Dosinia penicillata Reeve, 1850 Indo
 Dosinia phenax Finlay, 1930 New Zealand
 Dosinia physema Römer, 1870 Japan
 Dosinia protojuvenilis  Noetling 1901 †
 Dosinia pseudoargus  d'Archiac and Haime 1853 †
 Dosinia pseudoargus  gedrosiana Vredenburg 1928 †
 Dosinia pubescens Philippi, 1847 Indo
 Dosinia puella Angas, 1867 
 Dosinia radiata Reeve, 1850 Red Sea
 Dosinia roemeri R. W. Dunker, 1863 Japan
 Dosinia santana  Loel and Corey 1932 †
 Dosinia scabriuscula Philippi, 1847 Japan
 Dosinia scalaris  Menke 1843 †
 Dosinia scalaris (C. T. Menke, 1843) Indo
 Dosinia sculpta  Hanley 1845 †
 Dosinia sculpta (Hanley, 1845) Australia
 Dosinia semiobliterata  Deshayes 1853
 Dosinia sieboldii Reeve, 1850 Japan
 Dosinia stabilis Iredale, 1929 Indo
 Dosinia subalata Smith, 1916 China, Japan
 Dosinia subrosea (Gray, 1835) 
 Dosinia subulata Smith, 1916 Japan
 Dosinia troscheli (Lischke, 1873) Indo
 Dosinia truncata Zhuang, 1964 China
 Dosinia tugaruana  Nomura 1935 †
 Dosinia tumida (Gray, 1838) Red Sea
 Dosinia variegata (Gray, 1838) Indian Ocean
 Dosinia victoriae (Gatliff and Gabriel, 1914) Australia
 Dosinia zilchi Fischer

References 

 ITIS
 Powell A. W. B., New Zealand Mollusca, William Collins Publishers Ltd, Auckland, New Zealand 1979 
 Glen Pownall, New Zealand Shells and Shellfish, Seven Seas Publishing Pty Ltd, Wellington, New Zealand 1979 
 Abott and Morris, Shells of the Atlantic and Gulf Coasts and the West Indies, Peterson Field Guides, 
 Hayward et al., Sea Shore of Britain and Europe, 1996

 
Bivalve genera
Taxa named by Giovanni Antonio Scopoli